Srostki is a rural locality (a selo) and the administrative center of Srostinsky selsoviet, Biysky District, Altai Krai, Russia. The population was 2,769 as of 2013. There are 30 streets.

Vasily Shukshin, a prominent Soviet actor and Village Prose writer, was born here in 1929.

Geography 
Srostki is located on the Katun River, 37 km southeast of Biysk (the district's administrative centre) by road. Talitsa is the nearest rural locality.

References 

Rural localities in Biysky District